Tania Arrayales (born 1 August 1996) is a Mexican sabre fencer.

References

1996 births
Living people
Sportspeople from Tijuana
Fencers at the 2016 Summer Olympics
Olympic fencers of Mexico
Mexican female sabre fencers
21st-century Mexican women